Ancistrus centrolepis is a species of catfish in the family Loricariidae. It is a freshwater species native to South America, where it occurs in coastal drainages of the northern Andes, including the Atrato River, Baudó River, and San Juan River basins in Colombia. The species reaches 18.4 cm (7.2 inches) SL.

References 

centrolepis
Fish described in 1913